Aleksandar Sedlar (born 13 December 1991) is a Serbian footballer who plays for Spanish club Deportivo Alavés. He can play as a wide or central midfielder, and in defense as a centre or full-back.

Sedlar has started his career as a midfielder, but affirmed himself as a centre-back playing with Metalac Gornji Milanovac.

Career

Early career
Born in Novi Sad, Sedlar passed the youth school of FK Vojvodina. He started his senior career playing with local clubs Borac and Indeks. Later he moved in the Serbian League Vojvodina club, Veternik, where he made 14 appearances for the 2011–12 season.

Metalac Gornji Milanovac

2012–13 season
Sedlar joined Metalac for the 2012–13 season. He made 21 appearances in the Serbian First League and also played in 2 cup matches.

2013–14 season
For the difference of previous season, while he played mostly as a midfielder, Sedlar got the new role, and in new season, he was used usually as a defender. Sometimes, he also was moved to left-back position while he has played as a midfielder, so positions in defense were no strage for him. Later, he was rotated on centre-back position, but he was not the first choice, so he made only 3 league caps and one cup match for the autumn half of season. After changing coach, formation was changed too, and Metalac was playing with 3 centre-backs for the better part of spring half-season. Sedlar played all matches in that period, and his position was something like Emre Can's in Liverpool for 2014–15 season. He made total 20 appearances until the end of season, including 18 league, 1 cup, and 1 play-off match.

2014–15 season
In the 2014–15 season, Sedlar was in group of the most important players for Metalac, with 26 league caps. He also played on some different positions as in the past, but all of 26 matches he started on the field and scored 2 goals, against Jedinstvo Putevi, and Javor Ivanjica. He also played 2 cup matches, against and Napredak and Voždovac, and 2 play-off matches after then Metalac promoted in Serbian SuperLiga.

2015–16 season
Sedlar made his SuperLiga debut in the 1st fixture of 2015–16 season as a centre-back, in tandem with Vladimir Otašević. In the 7th fixture he scored a goal in away win against Spartak Subotica. In the 9th fixture he also scored an away goal, against Vojvodina. Sedlar missed some matches in the first half season because of injury, but beginning of December, the media reported Red Star Belgrade has expressed interest in him. Later, after the end first half of season, appeared the information that Partizan interested too. During the season, Sedlar played mostly matches as a team captain, and was one of the most important players in roster. Sedlar was also selected in the team of the season by Sportski žurnal.

Piast Gliwice
Sedlar signed three-year contract with Ekstraklasa club Piast Gliwice in June 2016.

Mallorca
On 12 July 2019, Sedlar signed a four-year deal with La Liga side RCD Mallorca as a free agent.

Alavés
On 5 July 2022, Sedlar signed a two-year contract with Deportivo Alavés in Segunda División, after his contract with Mallorca expired.

International career
The coach of the Serbia national team, Slavoljub Muslin, called Sedlar into the squad for several friendly matches during the year 2016. He made his first appearance for the Serbia national football team in a friendly 2–1 win against Cyprus on 25 May 2016.

Career statistics

Club

International

Honours
Piast Gliwice
Ekstraklasa: 2018–19

Individual
Ekstraklasa Defender of the Season: 2018–19

References

External links
 Aleksandar Sedlar stats at utakmica.rs 
 
 
 
 

1991 births
Living people
Footballers from Novi Sad
Serbian footballers
Association football midfielders
Serbian First League players
Serbian SuperLiga players
FK Veternik players
FK Metalac Gornji Milanovac players
Ekstraklasa players
Piast Gliwice players
La Liga players
Segunda División players
RCD Mallorca players
Deportivo Alavés players
Serbian expatriate footballers
Serbian expatriate sportspeople in Poland
Serbian expatriate sportspeople in Spain
Expatriate footballers in Poland
Expatriate footballers in Spain
Serbia international footballers